HRHS may refer to:
 Hypoplastic right heart syndrome, a rare congenital heart defect

Schools 
 Hampshire Regional High School, Westhampton, Massachusetts, United States
 Hickory Ridge High School, Harrisburg, North Carolina, United States
 Highlands Ranch High School, Highlands Ranch, Colorado, United States
 Holy Redeemer High School, Wilkes-Barre, Pennsylvania, United States
 Holy Rosary High School (New Orleans), Louisiana, United States
 Hood River Valley High School, Hood River, Oregon, United States
 Heritage Regional High School, Saint-Hubert, Quebec, Canada